"Faden Away" is a song by California-based funk duo 7 Days of Funk, released as the lead single of their eponymous debut studio album. The song premiered on October 8, 2013, on Stones Throw Records' SoundCloud page and was made available at the Stones Throw Store and iTunes Music Store on October 15, 2013. Stones Throw released "Faden Away" along with "Hit Da Pavement" on a cassingle on December 10, 2013, with both vocal and instrumental versions. The cassette was given away exclusively with the first week's orders of the LP and 45 box set.

"Faden Away", written by Calvin Broadus and Damon Riddick, was recorded at The Compound in Los Angeles, California in 2013. The song, mixed by Shon Lawon and Cole M.G.N., was produced by Riddick under his stage name Dâm-Funk and the vocals were performed by Broadus under his latest moniker Snoopzilla. The song also features background vocals from Shon Lawon and Val Young.

Background and concept
Snoop discovered that Dâm-Funk had an instrumental track called "Fadin" from his 2012 EP I Don't Wanna Be a Star!.  Snoop wrote the vocals for the instrumental and created "Faden Away" based intimately on things he experienced in his life. "It's just real," Dâm-Funk told Life+Times. "A lot of brothers or sisters can relate to fading away from a relationship and that's what's so cool about working with him. He knew how to interpret things without me telling him. He took that one word I used as an instrumental title and created a whole concept about it. He did all the vocals. I did all music. It was 50-50."

The Southern California duo named "Faden Away" as their favorite song on the album. "I'm singing like a mothaf----r on there," Snoop told HipHopDX. "I just like the concept, too. When you get in a relationship with somebody, it could be with your wife, it could be with your girlfriend, it could be with your kids, it could be with your mom, it could be with your brothers, 'cause your relationships are relationships. And it gets to a point in time where it begins to fade away. But you try your best to hold on and keep the good things there. And a lot of times, we always looked at the ones who make the relationship go bad, but when it go bad, we the ones who try to keep the relationship together. So it's like that song represents so much of who I am and what I'm going through. Not even on a personal tip, but on a business tip. Maybe I'm fading away on a business tip, or the music side. Maybe I'm fading away careerwise. But it just feels like, 20 years from now, that record is still gonna be the shit, no matter where we at."

Music video
On November 5, 2013, the music video for "Faden Away" premiered on Stones Throw's YouTube. The vintage-looking footage was directed by Henry DeMaio, and features Snoopzilla donning a jerry curl wig while performing alongside Dâm-Funk at a smoke-filled house party in Los Angeles. At a certain point during the night, Snoop finds a girl in the audience and starts to take a liking to her. The clip ends with Snoop bringing the girl back to his room, with a "To Be Continued…" sign before its end. Henry DeMaio has written on Twitter that he directed two videos for the album.  On December 10, 2013, the music video for "Hit Da Pavement" premiered on VEVO and serves as the continuation of the plot in "Faden Away".

Live performances
On October 21, 2013, 7 Days of Funk debuted their single on Jimmy Kimmel Live!, along with another song from the album, titled "Do My Thang". Backed by a full band during the performance which was highlighted by an appearance from Don "Magic" Juan, Snoopzilla and Dâm-Funk both wore matching white gloves, and Dâm played his keytar, then destroyed it in celebration.  This marked Snoop's first appearance on Jimmy Kimmel Live! since the show's very first week of existence, and he also sat down for an interview with Kimmel. On December 9, 2013, the duo performed "Faden Away" on Conan, and The Queen Latifah Show on the following day.  For Conan O'Brien, 7 Days of Funk enlisted their whole band, including hip hop producer Terrace Martin.  Snoop also sat down with Conan for an interview to promote the album and some of his other endeavors.  For Queen Latifah, they performed with their skeleton crew accompanied by two white-gloved poppers.

Critical reception
The song was met with generally positive reviews from music critics. Richard Spadine of DJBooth complimented the song, writing that "Snoop's Autotuned come-ons and his partner's keytar-driven electro-funk grooves coalesce into an eminently catchy end product". Chase Woodruff, writing for Slant Magazine, highlighted Dâm-Funk's production, calling it a "master class in silky-smooth funktronica production". Nate Patrin of Pitchfork noted that Snoopzilla achieved to make "breakup ruminations without sounding antagonistic" and wrote that he is "not Nate Dogg or anything, but his workmanlike singing voice is smooth enough to mesh with the piled-high space-flight chords Dâm-Funk uses to buoy it."

Track listing
Digital single

Stones Throw Store digital single 

45 Box Set 

Cassingle

Credits and personnel
Recording
 Recorded and mixed at The Compound, Los Angeles, California.
 Mastered at Bernie Grundman Mastering, Hollywood, Los Angeles.

Personnel
 Calvin Broadus – composer, vocals
 Cole M.G.N. – mixing
 Brian "Big Bass" Gardner – mastering
 Shon Lawon – background vocals, engineering, mixing
 Damon Riddick – instrumentation, production
 Frank Vasquez – additional engineering
 Val Young – background vocals

Release history

References

2013 singles
2013 songs
Snoop Dogg songs
Funk songs
7 Days of Funk songs